Iraq in Fragments is a documentary film directed by James Longley. Longley shot the film in Digital Video on a Panasonic DVX100 miniDV camcorder. The film premiered at the 2006 Sundance Film Festival where it won three awards: "Directing Award Documentary", "Editing Award Documentary" and "Excellence in Cinematography Award Documentary". The film is also a part of the Iraq Media Action Project film collection. It was nominated for an Academy Award for Best Documentary Feature.  The film was shot in Iraq and edited at 911 Media Arts Center in Seattle. This film has three parts to it which describe the viewpoints of Sunni, Shi'ite, and Kurdish residents.

Film credits
Director: James Longley
Producers: John Sinno, James Longley
Editors: Billy McMillin, Fiona Otway, James Longley
Camera: James Longley
Post Coordinator: Basil Shadid
Sound / Music: James Longley
2nd Unit Camera: Margaret Longley
Re-Recording Mixer: Dave Howe
Colorist: Bill Lord
Translators: Ahmed Ayed, Ali Zekki, Dler Hashim, Duler Bojan, Istifan Braymok, Mohammed Mohana, Mustapha Hasan, Nadeem Hamid, Reyal Sindi, Zaid Al Rawi, Zaid Fahmi, Zirak Dilshad

Reception
Iraq in Fragments has an approval rating of 91% on review aggregator website Rotten Tomatoes, based on 65 reviews, and an average rating of 7.65/10. The website's critical consensus states, "A stylistically bold, humanist take on the difficulties of post-invasion Iraq". It also has a score of 84 out of 100 on Metacritic, based on 26 critics, indicating "universal acclaim".

References

External links

Iraq in Fragments on the Iraq Media Action Project

Documentary films about the Iraq War
American documentary films
2006 films
2006 documentary films
Sundance Film Festival award winners
2000s American films